HOOPLA! — 'Hooray for Object Oriented Programming Languages!' — was a periodical published by OOPSTAD.  It was one of the first publications entirely devoted to object-oriented programming techniques and the Smalltalk programming language. The magazine had its headquarters in Everett, Washington.

The first issue of HOOPLA! was available at OOPSLA-87; 1000 copies were printed.

References

Defunct computer magazines published in the United States
Magazines published in Washington (state)
Magazines with year of disestablishment missing
Magazines with year of establishment missing